Vicente Alberto Masferrer Mónico, known as Alberto Masferrer, was a Salvadoran  essayist, philosopher, fiction writer, and journalist, best known for the development of the philosophy of 'vitalismo'. He was born in Alegría, Usulután formerly Tecape, Usulután on 24 July 1868. He did not receive a formal education, instead claiming to have been educated by "the university of life," but he did travel widely, having lived in several Central American countries, as well as in Chile, New York, and several European nations. During his public career at the Ministry of Foreign Affairs of El Salvador, he served as an ambassador of El Salvador in Argentina, Chile, Costa Rica, and Belgium, and served as a professor in Guatemala, El Salvador, Honduras, Costa Rica, Chile, and Argentina. Having served in the government of President Arturo Araujo, he was sent into exile in Honduras by the dictatorship of Maximiliano Hernández Martínez following the uprising of 1932 known as the 1932 Salvadoran peasant massacre, dying that same year on 8 September in the city of Tegucigalpa. (There are some uncertainties regarding his death, with some sources claiming that he died in El Salvador, though these claims are in the minority). He was well respected during his life, having earned the praise of such major Salvadoran figures as Arturo Ambrogi, Miguel Ángel Espino, Claudia Lars, and Salarrué.

Beginnings
Alberto Masferrer was born in a town in eastern El Salvador, pipil home and subsequently dominated by the Lenca. The home he was born in was owned by the Mejia family and is now a small museum. His education was self-education in combination with formal education. His love of reading led him to choose teaching as a career. In this regard, Arturo Ambrogi stated that "I have rarely seen a lecturer as tremendous as Alberto."

Career

As a politician
Between 1928 and 1930, he founded and directed the newspaper Patria, which was social criticism and called for justice for those most in need in the context of widespread poverty in the country. He worked day and national and international journals, was editor of the newspaper El Chileno and El Mercurio, Santiago de Chile, the weekly La Reforma newspaper The workers united, in the magazines The Republic of Central America, News, Scientific Bibliographic Literature, The Seed and others.

He began his political career as consul of El Salvador in Argentina (1901), Chile (1902), Costa Rica (1907) and Belgium (1910),
 and in the International Court of Justice in 1912 [also served as Archivist of nation's largest auditing office], editor and director of the Official Journal (1892), Secretary of the National Institute (1890) and Advisor to the Ministry of Education (1916). Under the basic premise of the peaceful struggle for the rights of each individual, became the ideologue and political campaign manager for the future president, the engineer Arturo Arajo in 1930. That same year he was elected as national deputy president separating himself politically from the president and their positions.

Despite his opposition to the arrival to the presidency of General Maximiliano Hernández Martínez, the military takeover was inevitable. Since then, Masferrer tried to contain the violence unleashed months later, in the 1932 Salvadoran peasant uprising, which resulted in the deaths of thousands of natives and Masferrer's exile to Honduras. His relationship with the Salvadoran Communist Party is unclear, although there are references about the pacifistic influence that he as a writer, tried, although it failed.

As teacher and writer
He taught in Guatemala, El Salvador, Honduras, Costa Rica, Chile and Argentina and is named "teacher and director of Crowds" by Claudia Lars.

As a writer, his work was characterized primarily by social themes, requiring a minimum of rights for each person, dignifying the human being through the use of words mainly hard, causing conflict on socially acceptable behavior. Occasionally used the pseudonym "LutrinVitalismoVitalismo was a philosophical doctrine developed by Masferrer in several of his essays, particularly "El mínimum vital." This philosophy espouses the idea that all individuals, regardless of gender or race, have the right to a basic standard of life, through equal access to education, work, food, and shelter. Through this philosophy, Masferrer also argued for pacifism, influenced by the efforts of Mahatma Gandhi. Vitalismo can be seen in many of Masferrer's essays, as well as in his novella Una vida en el cine.

Partial bibliography
 ¿Qué debemos saber? (essay, 1913)
 Leer y escribir (essay, 1915)
 Una vida en el cine (novella, 1922)
 Ensayo sobre el destino (essay, 1925)
 Las siete cuerdas de la lira (essay, 1926)
 El dinero maldito (essay, 1927)
 Helios (essay, 1928)
 La religión universal (essay, 1928)
 El minimum vital (essay, 1929)
 Estudios y figuraciones de la vida de Jesús (essay, 1930)

The most complete selection of Masferrer's works is the 3 volume collection Obras de Alberto Masferrer.'' San Salvador: Universidad Autónoma de El Salvador, 1951.

References 

Salvadoran male writers
1868 births
1932 deaths
Ambassadors of El Salvador to Argentina
Ambassadors of El Salvador to Belgium
Ambassadors of El Salvador to Chile
Ambassadors of El Salvador to Costa Rica
19th-century Salvadoran people
19th-century Salvadoran writers
20th-century Salvadoran writers